Zana may refer to:

Mythological figures
 Zână, a female mythological figure in Romanian mythology
 Zana (mythology), an Albanian mythological figure

Places
 Diana Veteranorum or Zana, an ancient Roman city in Algeria
 Zana, Burkina Faso, a village in Bam Province
 Zana, Ethiopia, a village near Shiraro in the Tigray Region
 Zana, Florida, a ghost town in Florida, U.S.
 Zana, Uganda, a neighborhood in Ssabagabo Municipality, Wakiso District
 Zana Khan District, Ghazni Province, Afghanistan
 Zaņa Parish, Latvia
 Zaña, a town in northern Peru
 Zaña River. a river in Northern Peru
 Zaña Valley, an archaeological area in northern Peru

People
The name Zana, also means handsome in the Yazdi dialect. 
 Leyla Zana (born 1961), Turkish Kurdish politician
 Zana Allée (born 1994), Kurdish-born French footballer
 Zana Briski (born 1966), photographer and filmmaker
 Zana Clarke (born 1965), Australian composer
 Zana Fraillon (born 1981), Australian writer for children and young adults
 Zana Krasniqi (born 1988), beauty queen and fashion model
 Zana Marjanović (born 1983), Bosnian actress
 Zana Muhsen (born 1965), English author
 Zana Nimani (born 1961), Yugoslav singer with the band Zana
 Zana Ramadani (born 1984), German politician and feminist activist
 Žana Novaković (born 1985), alpine skier for Bosnia and Herzegovina

Other uses
 Zana (band), a Serbian music group
 Zana (film), a 2019 Kosovan drama film directed by Antoneta Kastrati

 Zambia News Agency or ZANA, the official Zambian news agency
 "Zana", an Abkhazian "wild-woman" believed by some people to have been a relict hominid; see Almas (folklore)